The 1965 season was the Minnesota Vikings' fifth in the National Football League (NFL). Under head coach Norm van Brocklin, the team finished with a 7–7 record.

Offseason

1965 Draft

 The Vikings traded RB Hugh McElhenny to the New York Giants in exchange for the Giants' second-round selection (15th overall) and 1964 fourth-round selection (53rd overall).
 The Vikings traded their third-round selection (36th overall) to the Pittsburgh Steelers in exchange for RB Bob Ferguson.
 The Vikings traded DT Mike Bundra to the Cleveland Browns in exchange for Cleveland's fourth-round selection (55th overall) (and by some reports their 1966 6th round selection (90th overall)).
 The Vikings traded their fifth-round selection (64th overall) to the Detroit Lions in exchange for WR Tom Hall and HB Bruce Zellmer.
 The Vikings traded their seventh-round selection (92nd overall) and 1966 sixth-round selection (87th overall) to the Detroit Lions in exchange for DT Mike Bundra and E Larry Vargo.
 The Vikings traded DT Roy Williams to the San Francisco 49ers in exchange for San Francisco's eighth-round selection (100th overall).

Roster

Preseason

Regular season

Schedule

Note: The game against the Giants, originally scheduled for Sunday, October 10, was brought forward to Saturday night because of the World Series.

Standings

Statistics

Team leaders

League rankings

References

Minnesota Vikings seasons
Minnesota
Minnesota Vikings